The Greek Labyrinth is a 1993 Spanish thriller film directed by Rafael Alcázar and starring Penélope Cruz, Eusebio Poncela and Fernando Guillén Cuervo. In Spanish the title is El Laberinto griego. It is set in and around the city of Barcelona.

References

External links 
 

1993 films
1990s mystery thriller films
Spanish detective films
1990s Spanish-language films
Spanish mystery thriller films
1990s Spanish films